Isabella Heathcote (born 27 May 1987) is an Australian actress and model. She began her acting career in 2008. The following year, she had a recurring role as Amanda Fowler on the television soap opera Neighbours.

Heathcote has since portrayed governess Victoria Winters in Tim Burton's film adaptation of Dark Shadows, Jane Bennett in Pride and Prejudice and Zombies, model Gigi in The Neon Demon, Nicole Dörmer in the dystopian alternate history thriller series The Man in the High Castle, Leila Williams, a deranged ex-lover of Christian Grey, in Fifty Shades Darker and Olive Byrne in Professor Marston and the Wonder Women.

Early life
Heathcote was born in Melbourne, Australia. Her father was a lawyer. She attended Korowa Anglican Girls' School. She began her career in 2008. In May 2010, she was a recipient of a Heath Ledger Scholarship.

Career
In December 2010, Heathcote was cast in David Chase's film Not Fade Away. In February 2011, Tim Burton selected Heathcote to play Victoria Winters and Josette du Pres in his film adaptation of Dark Shadows, starring opposite Johnny Depp, Michelle Pfeiffer, and Helena Bonham Carter. She was later cast in Nicolas Winding Refn's thriller film The Neon Demon, which was released in 2016.

Heathcote was named as one of the 10 Actors to Watch: Breakthrough Performances of 2012 at the 20th Hamptons International Film Festival. The following year, she starred alongside Max Minghella in The Killers' music video for "Shot at the Night". Heathcote was part of the Spring/Summer 2014 campaign for Miu Miu alongside fellow actresses Lupita Nyong'o, Elle Fanning and Elizabeth Olsen.

In 2017, Heathcote played Leila Williams in the film Fifty Shades Darker, the sequel to Fifty Shades of Grey. She also joined the season 2 cast of television drama The Man in the High Castle, as Nicole Dörmer, a Berlin-born filmmaker. Heathcote starred as Olive Byrne, partner of psychologists and comic book authors William Moulton Marston and Elizabeth Holloway Marston, in the 2017 biographical film Professor Marston and the Wonder Women.

Heathcote played Susan Parsons in the CBS All Access drama Strange Angel. The show is an adaptation of George Pendle's book Strange Angel: The Otherworldly Life of Rocket Scientist John Whiteside Parsons. The series was cancelled after two seasons in November 2019. Heathcote appears in the second season of Australian web television series Bloom as a younger incarnation of Loris Webb, played by Anne Charleston.

Heathcote appeared in the independent drama Relic, alongside Emily Mortimer and Robyn Nevin. The film follows a daughter, a mother and a grandmother who are "haunted by a manifestation of dementia that consumes their family's home". The movie was produced by AGBO Films, the Russo Brothers production company and Jake Gyllenhaal, while co-written and directed by Natalia Erika James. Heathcote stars alongside Toni Collette in the 2022 Netflix thriller series Pieces of Her, which is adapted from the Karin Slaughter novel of the same name.

Heathcote will star in the Stan and Nine Network crime drama Scrublands, alongside Luke Arnold and Jay Ryan. The series is based on the novel written by Chris Hammer. Production began in Victoria in February 2023.

Personal life
Heathcote was previously engaged to film director Andrew Dominik.

She married architect Richard Stampton in January 2019.

Filmography

References

External links
 

1987 births
Australian film actresses
Australian soap opera actresses
Living people
Actresses from Melbourne
21st-century Australian actresses